was a town in Kashima District, Ibaraki Prefecture, Japan.

As of 2003, the town had an estimated population of 38,983 and a density of 570.93 persons per km². The total area is 68.28 km².

On August 1, 2005, Hasaki, along with the old town of Kamisu (also from Kashima District), was merged to create the city of Kamisu and no longer exists as an independent municipality.

External links
Official website 

Dissolved municipalities of Ibaraki Prefecture
1889 establishments in Japan
Populated places established in 1889
Populated places disestablished in 2005
2005 disestablishments in Japan